Scott Webster is an American politician in Iowa.

Webster was elected representative of the fifth ward of Bettendorf, Iowa's city council in a 2014 special election. In 2018, he mounted an unsuccessful bid for a position on the Scott County board of supervisors. While serving on the city council, Webster was appointed to the Iowa League of Cities Legislative Policy Committee from January 2019. In February 2022, he began campaigning to represent District 47 in the Iowa Senate. Webster faced Barry Long in the Republican Party primary, and defeated Democratic candidate Mary Kathleen Figaro in the general election.

References

Living people
Year of birth missing (living people)
Republican Party Iowa state senators
21st-century American politicians
People from Bettendorf, Iowa
Iowa city council members